Calvanico is a town and comune in the province of Salerno in the Campania region of south-western Italy.

Demographics

References

External links

Cities and towns in Campania